Pierre-Yves Trémois (8 January 1921 – 16 August 2020) was a French visual artist and sculptor, known for evocative works drawing in equal proportions on surrealism and science illustration, and for combining graphic precision and rigor with flamboyant fantasy. He was born in Paris.

He held seat #2 in the engraving section at the Académie des Beaux-Arts.

Decorations 
 Commander of the Order of Arts and Letters (2015)

References

External links 
 Pierre-Yves Trémois website

1921 births
2020 deaths
20th-century engravers
French engravers
French etchers
20th-century French painters
20th-century French male artists
French male painters
21st-century French painters
Modern printmakers
Prix de Rome for painting
Members of the Académie des beaux-arts
20th-century French sculptors
French male sculptors
Commandeurs of the Ordre des Arts et des Lettres
20th-century French printmakers